HMS H7 was a British H-class submarine built by the Canadian Vickers Co, Montreal, Quebec, Canada. She was laid down on 19 May 1915 and was commissioned in June 1915. HMS H7 was sold in 1921.

Design

H7 was fitted with a  Hotchkiss quick-firing gun (6-pounder) and four  torpedo tubes. Its torpedo tubes were fitted to the bows and the submarine was loaded with eight  torpedoes. It is a Holland 602 type submarine but was designed to meet Royal Navy specifications. Its complement was twenty-two crew members.

References

 

 

British H-class submarines
Ships built in Quebec
1915 ships
World War I submarines of the United Kingdom
Royal Navy ship names